The Battle at Chignecto happened during Father Le Loutre's War when Charles Lawrence, in command of the  45th Regiment of Foot (Hugh Warburton's regiment) and the 47th Regiment (Peregrine Lascelles' regiment), John Gorham in command of the Rangers and Captain John Rous in command of the navy, fought against the French monarchists at Chignecto. This battle was the first attempt by the British to occupy the head of the Bay of Fundy since the disastrous Battle of Grand Pré three years earlier. They fought against a militia made up of Mi'kmaq and Acadians led by Jean-Louis Le Loutre and Joseph Broussard (Beausoliel). The battle happened at Isthmus of Chignecto, Nova Scotia on 3 September 1750.

Background

Despite the British conquest of Acadia in 1710, Nova Scotia remained primarily occupied by Catholic Acadians and Mi'kmaq. By the time Cornwallis had arrived in Halifax, there was a long history of the Wabanaki Confederacy (which included the Mi'kmaq) launching raids on British colonial settlements along the New England/ Acadia border in Maine (See the Northeast Coast Campaigns 1688, 1703, 1723, 1724, 1745, 1746, 1747).

To prevent the establishment of British colonial settlements in the region, Mi'kmaq launched raids on present-day Shelburne (1715) and Canso (1720). A generation later, Father Le Loutre's War began when Edward Cornwallis arrived to establish Halifax with 13 transports on June 21, 1749.

Within 18 months of establishing Halifax, the British also took firm control of peninsula Nova Scotia by building fortifications in all the major Acadian communities: present-day Windsor (Fort Edward); Grand Pre (Fort Vieux Logis) and Chignecto (Fort Lawrence). (A British fort already existed at the other major Acadian centre of Annapolis Royal, Nova Scotia. Cobequid remained without a fort.) After the raid in Dartmouth in 1749, on October 2, 1749, Cornwallis created an extirpation proclamation to stop the raids. The Siege of Grand Pre was the first recorded conflict in the region after the raid on Dartmouth.

Battle

On 23 April, Lawrence was unsuccessful in getting a base at Chignecto because Le Loutre led 70 Mi'kmaq and 30 Acadians in burning the village of Beaubassin, preventing Lawrence from using its supplies to establish a fort. (According to the historian Frank Patterson, the Acadians at Cobequid also burned their homes as they retreated from the British to Tatamagouche, Nova Scotia in 1754.) Lawrence retreated, but he returned in September 1750.

On September 3, 1750 Captain John Rous, Lawrence and Gorham led over 700 men (including the 40th, 45th and 47th Regiments) to Chignecto, where Mi'kmaq and Acadians opposed their landing.  They had thrown up a breastwork from behind which they opposed the landing. They killed twenty British, who in turn killed several Mi'kmaq. The Mi'kmaq and Acadians killed Captain Francis Bartelo in the Battle at Chignecto.  Le Loutre's militia eventually withdrew to Beausejour, burning the rest of the Acadians' crops and houses as they went.

Aftermath 
On 15 October (N.S.) a group of Micmacs disguised as French officers called a member of the Nova Scotia Council Edward How to a conference. This trap, organized by Étienne Bâtard, gave him the opportunity to wound How seriously, and How died five or six days later, according to Captain La Vallière (probably Louis Leneuf de La Vallière), the only eye-witness. After the battle, the British built Fort Lawrence at Chignecto and the Mi'kmaq people and Acadians continued with numerous raids on Dartmouth and Halifax.

Gallery

References
Endnotes

Primary Sources
 The history of the life and sufferings of Henry Grace, of Basingstoke in the county of Southampton. Being a narrative of the hardships he underwent during several years captivity among the savages in North America, ... Written by himself
 Letters concerning the Battle of Chignecto. 1750.
 London Magazine, July 1750, p. 291
London Magazine, August 1750, p. 371
 London Magazine. Nov. 1750, Vol. 19. p. 521
 The London magazine, or, Gentleman's monthly intelligencer ... v.21 1752, p. 359
 The journal of Joshua Winslow, recording his participation in the events of the year 1750 memorable in the history of Nova Scotia

Literature cited
 
 
 
 Landry, Peter. The Lion & The Lily. Vol. 1. Victoria: Trafford, 2007.
 
 Rompkey, Ronald, ed. Expeditions of Honour: The Journal of John Salusbury in Halifax, Nova Scotia, 1749-53. Newark: U of Delaware P, Newark, 1982.

1750 in Nova Scotia
Military history of Acadia
Military history of Nova Scotia
Military history of New England
Military history of the Thirteen Colonies
Acadian history
Chignecto
Chignecto
Mi'kmaq in Canada
Chignecto
Father Le Loutre's War